Maximum Darkness is the tenth album by the Welsh rock band Man and was released on the United Artists Records label September 1975. It was the second live album released by the band, excluding contributions to two "various artists" live albums, and featured John Cipollina as special guest. Rumours that Micky Jones had to over-dub Cipollina’s guitar, as it was out of tune, before the album could be released, are greatly exaggerated. Only one track, "Bananas", had to have his playing removed/replaced, per Deke Leonard: "Everything ... which sounds like Cipollina is Cipollina."
The album spent two weeks in the UK album chart, peaking at No 25. It was the band's last release on United Artists, before moving to MCA Records.

Track listing 

Both tracks recorded live at The Keystone, Berkeley, California in April 1975.

Personnel 
 Micky Jones – guitar, vocals
 Deke Leonard – guitar, vocals
 Martin Ace – bass, guitar, vocals
 Terry Williams – drums, vocals

Guest 
 John Cipollina – guitar

Credits 
 Rick Griffin – lettering, logo design
 Vic Maile – recording & mixing
 Keith Morris – front cover photograph, inside photos
 Edmund Shea – inside photos
 Rick Lefrak – stage lighting

References

External links 
 Man - Maximum Darkness (1975) album reviews, credits & releases at AllMusic.com
 Man - Maximum Darkness (1975) album releases & credits at Discogs.com
 Man - Maximum Darkness (1975) album credits & user reviews at ProgArchives.com
 Man - Maximum Darkness (1975) album to be listened as stream at Spotify.com

1975 live albums
Man (band) live albums
United Artists Records live albums